Frank James Robert Perfitt (1880 – 1958) was a British film actor, born in Norwich, Norfolk in 1880. He died in Surrey in 1958.

Selected filmography
 The Flying Fifty-Five (1924)
 Love and Hate (1924)
 The Sins Ye Do (1924)
 Nelson (1926)
 Dawn (1928)
 What Next? (1928)
 Maria Marten(1928)
 The Silent House (1929)
 The Celestial City (1929)
 The Woman in White (1929)
 Alf's Carpet (1929)
 Night Birds (1930)
 Red Pearls (1930)
 You'd Be Surprised! (1930)
 Compromising Daphne (1930)
 The Love Race (1931)
 Number, Please (1931)
 The Pride of the Force (1933)
 Tonight's the Night (1932)
 Keep Your Seats, Please (1936)
 Feather Your Nest (1937)

References

External links

British male film actors
Actors from Norwich
English male silent film actors
20th-century English male actors
20th-century British male actors
1880 births
1958 deaths